Pyrausta elwesi is a moth in the family Crambidae. It was described by Staudinger in 1900. It is found in Russia (Altai).

References

Moths described in 1900
elwesi
Moths of Asia